The  was the major navy base for the Imperial Japanese Navy in the Kwantung Leased Territory before and during Second Sino-Japanese War. Located in at Ryojun ), (present-day Lüshunkou, China, The Ryojun Guard District was responsible for control of the strategic seaward approaches to Manchukuo and to north China and for patrols in the Yellow Sea and along the China coastlines. It was disbanded in 1943.

History
The  were second tier naval bases, similar to the first tier , with docking, fueling and resupply facilities, but typically lacked a shipyard or training school. They tended to be established by strategic waterways or major port cities for defensive purposes. In concept, the Guard District was similar to the United States Navy Sea Frontiers concept. the Guard District maintained a small garrison force of ships and Naval Land Forces which reported directly to the Guard District commander, and hosted detachments of the numbered fleets on a temporary assignment basis.

The port of Ryojun on the Kwantung Peninsula was an area with a long association with the Imperial Japanese Navy, having been first seized during the First Sino-Japanese War in December 1894. Japan was forced to abandon the port due to the Triple Intervention in February 1896, and its port facilities were soon occupied and developed by the Imperial Russian Navy as Port Arthur, Russia’s most important naval base in the Far East.

However, it lacked the shipyards, armories and the training facilities associated with other naval districts, (for which it relied on Sasebo Naval District). Tasked primarily with coastal patrols of the Liaodong Peninsula and control of the strategic seaward approaches to Tianjin and Beijing, it was regarded as a prestigious posting, with its commander receiving his commission directly from the Emperor.

It served as a staging point and refueling base in World War I for operations against the Imperial German Navy’s German East Asia Squadron based out of Tsingtao. With the Allied victory in World War I eliminating the German threat and with the Washington Naval Treaty limiting naval forces, Ryojun Military Port was deactivated on December 1, 1922.

In April 1933, the base was reactivated, and its role expanding to include patrols and guard of the coastline of Manchukuo. On November 20, 1941 in anticipation of the coming war with the United States, Ryojun was upgraded to Guard District status.

However, on January 15, 1942, with Japan in full control of the seaward approaches to China and Manchukuo, the Guard District was again deactivated.

Order of Battle at time of the attack on Pearl Harbor
Ryojun Guard District 
Minesweeper Division 32
Shanan Maru #16

List of commanders
Commanding officer

 
Chief of Staff

References

External links

Imperial Japanese Navy
Naval installations
Manchukuo Imperial Navy
History of Dalian
Kwantung Leased Territory
1904 establishments in China
1943 disestablishments in China
1904 establishments in the Japanese colonial empire
1943 disestablishments in the Japanese colonial empire